Durbaniella clarki, the Clark's rocksitter, is a butterfly of the family Lycaenidae. It is found in South Africa.

The wingspan is 18–24 mm for males and 18–26 mm for females. Adults are on wing from September to December. There is one generation per year.

The larvae feed on cyanobacteria species.

Subspecies
D. c. clarki (Western Cape from Langeberg along Swartberg to Kammanassieberg, Schoemanspoort and along Witteberge to Willowmore)
D. c. belladonna Ball, 1994 (low altitude rocky riverbeds near Jansenville in the Eastern Cape)
D. c. jenniferae Ball, 1994 (along the Outeniqua range, the Tsitsikamma and Baviaanskloof ranges to Uitenhage)
D. c. phaea Ball, 1994 (Riviersonderend Mountains and the hills between Worcester and Montagu in the Western Cape)

References

Butterflies described in 1941
Poritiinae